Mohammad Salehi (born 6 May 1983) is an Iranian weightlifter who won the silver medal in the Men's +105 kg weight class at the 2008 Asian Weightlifting Championships.

References

External links 
 
 

1983 births
Living people
Iranian male weightlifters
Iranian strength athletes
21st-century Iranian people